Duolun may refer to:

Duolun County, in Inner Mongolia, China
Dolon Nor, county seat of Duolun County, Inner Mongolia, China
Duolun Road, in Shanghai, China